Milad Beigi Harchegani (born 1 March 1991 in Booshehr) is an Iranian-born naturalized Azerbaijani taekwondo practitioner who won a bronze medal at the 2016 Summer Olympics. Harchegani is of Qashqai ancestry.

In February 2015, Beigi won the −80  kg gold medal in 26th Fajr Cup for Iran's B team. He was considered among Iran's prospects in 2015 World Taekwondo Championships, but it was declared that he had been replaced due to "injury" despite allegations that he has left threatening to acquire citizenship in another country. He was named the Male Most Valuable Player at the 2015 World Cup Team Championships.
He won a bronze medal at the 2016 Summer Olympics after beating Piotr Pazinsky in the bronze medal match.

References

External links
 

https://web.archive.org/web/20170703172527/http://www.baku2015.com/athletes/athlete/BEIGI-HARCHEGANI-Milad-1024157/index.html?intcmp=ev-brackets

Living people
1991 births
Azerbaijani male taekwondo practitioners
Iranian male taekwondo practitioners
European Games medalists in taekwondo
Olympic competitors from Iran who represented other countries
Taekwondo practitioners at the 2015 European Games
European Games competitors for Azerbaijan
Sportspeople from Isfahan
Qashqai people
Naturalized citizens of Azerbaijan
Taekwondo practitioners at the 2016 Summer Olympics
Olympic medalists in taekwondo
Medalists at the 2016 Summer Olympics
Olympic bronze medalists for Azerbaijan
Iranian emigrants to Azerbaijan
Universiade medalists in taekwondo
Universiade gold medalists for Azerbaijan
European Taekwondo Championships medalists
World Taekwondo Championships medalists
Medalists at the 2017 Summer Universiade
Islamic Solidarity Games medalists in taekwondo
Taekwondo practitioners at the 2020 Summer Olympics
Olympic taekwondo practitioners of Azerbaijan